O. P. S. Bhadoria is an Indian politician. He is a current MLA of Mehgaon constituency in Madhya Pradesh and a leader of the Scindia squad, currently serving as a Minister of State in the Shivraj Singh Chouhan led government.

Bhadoria stood as a candidate of the Indian National Congress (INC) for the Mehgaon constituency in the elections to the Madhya Pradesh Legislative Assembly of 2018. His principal opponent was Rakesh Shukla of the Bharatiya Janata Party (BJP). Bhadoria had lost the 2013 contest in that constituency to another BJP candidate, Mukesh Choudhary.

In July 2020, Bhadoria was appointed a minister of state. Along with some other MLAs, he had resigned from the assembly in March in a show of support for his leader Jyotiraditya Scindia who claim to have influence in Chambal-Gwalior region that had resulted in the collapse of the state government headed by Kamal Nath. The MLAs also resigned from the INC and joined the BJP.

References

Indian National Congress politicians from Madhya Pradesh
Madhya Pradesh MLAs 2018–2023
Living people
1969 births
People from Bhind